Glyphodes perelegans is a moth of the family Crambidae described by George Hampson in 1898. It is native to South America, where it is found in the Andes Mountains of Venezuela, Colombia, and Ecuador. It has been introduced to Hawaii to control banana poka (Passiflora tarminiana).

The wingspan is about 40 mm for females and 30 mm for males. The body is light brown and the forewings white with brown margins and a reddish band along the trailing edge.

The larvae feed on Passiflora mollissima. Before beginning to feed, most young larvae migrate to the tips of the developing shoots on which the eggs were laid. Here they begin to mine the growing shoot. Single larvae may also seek shelter between two touching leaves and begin feeding. The larvae remain in their mines or shelters for approximately two weeks. Later, larvae migrate back along the stem, attacking a developing flower bud.

Pupation occurs in a protected area between adjacent leaves or within a folded leaf where the larva spins an open, net-like cocoon. The pupa is light brown and about 10 mm long. Pupation lasts about 21 days in the summer and 31 days in the winter.

External links
Host Suitability Studies of the Moth, Pyrausta perelegans Hampson (Lepidoptera: Pyralidae), as a Control Agent of the Forest Weed Banana Poka, Passiflora mollissima (HBK) Bailey, in Hawaii

Moths described in 1898
Glyphodes